Marcus Porcius Cato "Uticensis" ("of Utica"; ; 95 BC – April 46 BC), also known as Cato the Younger, was an influential conservative Roman senator during the late Republic. His conservative principles were focused on the preservation of what he saw as old Roman values in decline. A noted orator and a follower of Stoicism, his scrupulous honesty and professed respect for tradition gave him a powerful political following which he mobilised against powerful generals (including Julius Caesar and Pompey) of his day.

Before Caesar's civil war, Cato served in a number of political offices. During his urban quaestorship in 63 BC, he was praised for his honesty and incorruptibility in running Rome's finances. He passed laws during his tribunate in 62 BC to expand the grain dole and force generals to give up their armies and commands before standing in elections. He also frustrated Pompey's ambitions by opposing a bill brought by Pompey's allies to transfer to Pompey the military command against the Catilinarian conspirators. He opposed, with varying success, Caesar's legislative programme during Caesar's first consulship in 59 BC. Leaving for Cyprus the next year, he was praised for his honest administration and after his return was elected as praetor for 54 BC.

He supported Pompey's sole consulship in 52 BC as a practical matter and to draw Pompey from his alliance with Caesar. In this, he was successful. He and his political allies advocated a policy of confrontation and brinksmanship with Caesar; though it seemed that Cato never advocated for actual civil war, this policy greatly contributed to the start of civil war in January 49 BC. During the civil war, he joined Pompey and tried to minimise the deaths of his fellow citizens. But after Pompey's defeat and his own cause's defeat by Caesar in Africa, he preferred to take his own life rather than beg or receive Caesar's pardon. His suicide turned him into a martyr for and a symbol of the Republic.

His political influence was rooted in his moralist principles and his embodiment of Roman traditions that appealed to both senators and the innately conservative Roman voter. He was criticised by contemporaries and by modern historians for being too uncompromising in obstructing Caesar and other powerful generals. Those tactics and their success led to the creation of the First Triumvirate and the outbreak of civil war. The epithet "the Younger" distinguishes him from his great-grandfather, Cato the Elder, who was viewed by ancient Romans in similar terms as embodying tradition and propriety.

Early life

Cato was born in 95 BC, the son of his homonymous father and Livia. He was descended from Cato the Elder – this Cato's great-grandfather – who was a novus homo ("new man") and the first of his family to be elected to the consulship. The elder Cato was famed for his austerity and "aggressive[] championing [of values] he considered to be traditionally Roman", which was "partly a façade or political tool" and meant to embellish his reputation as "the foremost representative of the mos maiorum".

He and his sister Porcia were orphaned, probably before Cato was four years old, and the children were taken in by their maternal uncle, Marcus Livius Drusus. After Drusus' death and the resulting start of the Social war in 91 BC, Cato and his sister probably came into the household of his mother's older brother, Mamercus Aemilius Lepidus Livianus. Moving in with Cato and his sister were a half-brother and two half-sisters from his mother Livia's first marriage to Quintus Servilius Caepio. Cato was especially close with his half-brother, Gnaeus Servilius Caepio, and his elder half-sister, Servilia, who would later marry Marcus Junius Brutus (the father of the tyrannicide) and become the mistress of Julius Caesar.

Stories of Cato's early childhood are broadly unreliable and told mainly to suggest that Cato's character as an adult had been established in childhood. They include claims that Cato was a poor student whose "tenacity was in reality the result of a lack of imagination", a dubious tale that Quintus Poppaedius Silo – one of the Italian leaders during the Social war – once threatened to hang Cato out of a window unless he voiced support for Italian citizenship (Cato supposedly remained silent), and a claim that Cato asked his tutor for a sword with which to assassinate Sulla during the proscriptions.

Around the age of 16, Cato was inducted into the quindecimviri sacris faciundis, the board of priests in charge of consulting and interpreting the Sibylline Oracles. This was a prestigious honour, for which he was likely selected on the initiative of his uncle Mamercus Lepdius, and it introduced Cato "to a powerful circle of influential senators".

Political development

Shortly after his induction into the quindecimviri, he received his inheritance, which immediately made him a wealthy citizen (though modest among the elite). Plutarch reports around this time, he also began to study Stoicism under the philosopher Antipater of Tyre, Epicureanism under a Philostratus, and Peripatetism under a certain Demetrius. His education in popular oratory and rhetoric was "highly unusual for a student of Stoic philosophy", implying that philosophy was only one part of his wider education.

Embodying the mos maiorum 

He also started to adopt an pattern of ostentatious public antiquarianism. To that end, he adopted an austere lifestyle where he refused to travel long distances on horseback (preferring to walk), travelled the city barefoot, and wore only a toga without a tunic. His sartorial choices were modelled on statues of Rome's legendary founders and heroes, who were depicted wearing togas alone, rather than any philosophical inclinations. These choices were deliberate and political:

His first appearance on the public stage was to oppose changes to the Basilica Porcia, a public building commissioned by his great-grandfather Cato the Elder during his term as censor in 184 BC. The plebeian tribunes proposed moving a column that impeded their view of the Forum. Cato may have been expected to defend the monument – "public buildings such as the Basilica Porcia were prized heirlooms that perpetuated a family's fame and greatness, so men could be expected to defend their family monuments" – but the column may not have actually been part of the Basilica. Regardless, Cato used the opportunity to enter public life with an appearance defending his family's honour and reputation, showing his pietas, and connecting himself to his famous ancestor.

Marriages and alliances 

Cato's first marriage was early in his twenties. He was first betrothed to his cousin Aemilia Lepida (a daughter of Mamercus Lepidus). The reasons were unclear: because of his close relations to Mamercus Lepidus, the match would not have been very useful politically in building new alliances; he may have been motivated by love or by the large size of the dowry. Aemilia Lepida had previously been betrothed to Quintus Caecilius Metellus Pius Scipio Nasica, but Scipio broke off the match, after which Cato was betrothed. However, some time later, Scipio changed his mind and Lepidus evidently decided that a match with Scipio was more desirable. The two were married shortly after. Cato was angry and threatened a lawsuit against his uncle to enforce the engagement, but was dissuaded by his friends.

He instead married Atilia, the daughter of an Atilius Serranus (the specific identity is unknown). While the gens Atilia had consular ancestors, it had not been successful in reaching the consulship after the end of the second century BC. By her, he later had a son, Marcus Porcius Cato, and a daughter, Porcia. Around this time he also secured an excellent marriage for his sister in Lucius Domitius Ahenobarbus. His half-sisters' very favourable matches helped develop a strong network of political allies.

Military service 

In 72 BC, Cato volunteered to fight in the war against Spartacus, presumably to support his half-brother Caepio, who was serving as a military tribune in the consular army of Lucius Gellius. Although the army was defeated twice in battle, Cato's valour was recognised. Although the consul Gellius recommended Cato for awards, he publicly declined them and "advertised that his standards for military accomplishment were much more stringent than the consul's, and the strangeness of this act was so shocking that it was talked about and remembered back in Rome".

A few years later, in 67 BC, he stood for the military tribunate. After winning election, he was dispatched to Macedonia under propraetor Marcus Rubrius, where he earned the respect of the soldiers by sharing their burdens and treating them justly. He also maintained his "unusual habit of walking everywhere instead of riding a horse". Over a winter, he travelled to Pergamum and became the patron of a Greek Stoic philosopher named Athenodorus who, contradicting Cato the Elder's "famous position against Greek philosophers", accompanied Cato back to Rome.

During his service in Macedonia, he received the news that his beloved half-brother Caepio was ill and dying in Thrace. He immediately went to see him but was unable to arrive before his brother's death. Cato was overwhelmed by grief and, ignoring Stoic principles of apatheia (living without passions), he spared no expense to organise lavish funeral ceremonies. After the end of his military commission, he travelled through Asia Minor and through Galatia "in such a quiet and unassuming way that he was often mistaken for a man of low status". Before returning to Rome, he also visited Pompey, who was then supervising the final stages of the Third Mithridatic War. Cato, according to Plutarch, received an exaggerated and deferential welcome from the proconsul, which most scholars doubt actually occurred.

Entry to politics 

Cato returned to Rome in early 65 BC and intended to stand for the quaestorship later that year. He spent substantial time familiarising himself with the laws related to the office – largely on administration of state finances both in Rome and in the provinces – and may have been angling to engage in reforms of state treasury operations. He was easily elected and took office on 5 December 65 BC.

Around this time, Lucullus – one of the wealthiest men in Rome and long-time commander of troops against Mithridates VI Eupator in the Third Mithridatic War – approached him about marrying Cato's younger half-sister Servilia. This was likely part of Lucullus' attempt to win allies in his bid for a triumph against Mithridates, which had been stymied by Pompey's supporters, who wanted to permit Pompey (then in Asia) to return and claim all the credit. Cato agreed and after the marriage, during his quaestorship, he helped Lucullus (by this point in the second or third year of campaigning for a triumph) in browbeating his opponents into eventually granting a triumph in 63 BC.

Quaestorship (63 BC) 

Cato was assigned to the state treasury (the aerarium) in Rome as one of the urban quaestors. The complexity of Roman financial law and the treasury's record-keeping had led to Roman aristocrats "abdicating their supervisory roles to the professional clerks who worked in the treasury" and resulted in widespread corruption. Cato started his term by prosecuting a number of the clerks and firing a number of others; even after one was acquitted after intervention from one of the censors, Cato refused to rehire him.

He also started the process of collecting on long-standing state debts and made prompt payments to state creditors. In doing so, he cooperated with Julius Caesar, who had then just completed a term as curule aedile and was acting as a prosecutor in court, in challenging the legal immunity and payments given to men who had received bounties for killings during the Sullan proscriptions. He also changed procedures to ensure that the treasury archives rejected fraudulent documents.

On his last day in the aerarium, Plutarch reports that he discovered that his old friend and colleague in the urban quaestorship, Marcus Claudius Marcellus, was entering fraudulent records; Cato apparently stormed back to erase them before the end of his term. He also spent an enormous amount of money – some five talents, about four per cent of his inheritance – to make copies of all the treasury archives from Sulla to his own day "to facilitate the prosecution of future wrongdoers" that might succeed him in the aerarium.

Cato gained an exemplary reputation for honesty in administering the aerarium. According to Plutarch's biography, he "taught men that a city can be rich without treating its citizens unjustly" and "brought the quaestorship into greater esteem than the senate, so that everybody thought and said that Cato had given the quaestorship the dignity of the consulship".

Tribunate (62 BC) 

In 63 BC, Cato stood for the plebeian tribunate of 62 BC. After his election but before his term started in December, he opposed granting additional honours to Pompey, engaged in an unsuccessful prosecution of Lucius Licinius Murena, and was part of in a famous debate on the Catilinarian conspiracy.

Catilinarian conspiracy 

Lucius Sergius Catilina, a noble patrician, led a rebellion against the state, raising an army in Etruria. Upon discovery of an associated plot against the lives of the consuls and other magistrates in Rome, Cicero arrested the conspirators within the city and proposed executing them without trial, a violation of citizen rights to appeal. While Cicero could have done this on his own authority (augmented by a senatus consultum ultimum), he convened the senate and put the matter before it, almost certainly to diffuse responsibility. The matter of killing the conspirators was a novel one: while the use of deadly force against citizens under arms was generally accepted, "the disposal of captured and unarmed conspirators was a more difficult matter".

Cato's brother-in-law, Decimus Junius Silanus, who was one of the consuls-elect, spoke first in favour of death, as did the rest of the former consuls. But Julius Caesar, then praetor-elect, countered with a proposal to imprison the conspirators, which started to gain the support of the house. Cato spoke two or three speeches after Caesar. According to Sallust, among other things he argued that the senate was being too soft against enemies of the state, that it was folly to await the ultimate test of the conspirators' guilt – the overthrow of the state – because the very proof of their guilt would make it impossible to enforce the laws, and that precedent and religious scruples demanded severe action. In Sallust's depiction, both Cato and Caesar make appeals to precedent and mos maiorum: Caesar calls executing the subdued conspirators "a new type of punishment" and attempted to draw Cato into contradicting his great-grandfather's lenient stance on the Rhodians after the Third Macedonian War; Cato viewed executing traitors as consistent with ancient Roman tradition. While Caesar's speech – due to the fact he was praetor-elect and would soon assume a presidency of one of the permanent courts – seemed to come with "an unspoken threat... of prosecution under a hostile judge", Cato's counter-arguments "stiffened [the senators'] resolve [and excited] their fears that they may not even live to see the next year if they did not take the hardest line possible".

Cato and his political allies also saw in the Catilinarian crisis an opportunity to ruin Caesar's career, if not have him killed, by falsely incriminating him in it. The famous story of Cato's misinterpreting a love letter from Servilia (Cato's half-sister and wife of consul-elect Silanus) to Caesar as incriminating evidence comes from this episode and "highlights how desperate Cato was to destroy Caesar". The source of the enmity was both political and personal: historians speculate various reasons, from political opposition to envy of Caesar's social and political success (by this time he had already been elected pontifex maximus, beating out a family ally,) to retaliation for malicious rumours of Caesar's having been Cato's nephew's father or that Caesar was purchasing sexual favours from Servilia's daughter. At the same time, it is easy to see contemporary parallels between Caesar and Catiline: Caesar had likely supported Catiline's bids for the consulship; Caesar, like Catiline, was buried under massive debts; Caesar too hailed from an ancient patrician clan that had fallen on hard times; and Caesar too would have been forced into exile or bankrupt obscurity if he were to fail in his political career.

As tribune 

Cato's first action on entering his tribunate in December 63 BC was to propose a law expanding the grain dole. He brought the bill with the support of the senate late in the year, according to Plutarch, to calm discontent in the city and strengthen the senate's political position. The law more than doubled the number of people receiving subsidised grain, placed a considerable burden on the republic's finances, and possibly made Cato one of the most generous politicians in the history of the grain dole. His grain bill also showed that the lex frumentaria was not the exclusive preserve of the so-called "populares", but rather, that "the advocacy of corn distribution knew no party".

One of the other tribunes of the plebs, Metellus Nepos, proposed two bills to grant Pompey additional honours. The first would transfer command of the (nearly completed) campaign against Catiline in northern Italy to Pompey. The second would have allowed Pompey to stand in absentia for the consulship of 61 BC and to lead troops into the pomerium (the sacred boundary of the city). Cato strongly opposed both. When Nepos initially presented the bill, Cato tried to talk him down as a friend but was unsuccessful, returning to invective after Nepos refused. The senate, at Cato's urging, voted down the bills; Nepos moved to bring them before the popular assemblies regardless.

Nepos, along with his ally Caesar, assembled the assembly at the Forum before the Temple of Castor and Pollux. Cato and one of his allies, another tribune named Quintus Minucius Thermus, forced their way to the front and Cato then "brusquely took a seat between Nepos and Caesar [to prevent] them from communicating privately". When Nepos directed the bill to be read, he vetoed it; when Nepos started to read it himself, Cato snatched the draft from his hands; when Nepos started to recite it from memory, Thermus put his hand over the Nepos' mouth to stop him from speaking. A fight accordingly broke out in the Forum. In response to the violence, the senate passed a senatus consultum ultimum; Nepos fled Rome to Pompey in the east and Caesar backed down. Suetonius and Plutarch then assert that Nepos, Caesar, or both were removed from their offices; modern scholars do not believe these assertions, as the senate during the republic had no such powers. More contemporaneous sources imply that the senate may have moved to ratify Nepos' departure from the city (tribunes were legally forbidden from leaving the city), which Cato likely objected to.

Later, Cato, with another fellow tribune named Lucius Marius, passed a law establishing penalties for military commanders who misrepresented the number of enemies or Roman soldiers killed in battles and required commanders to swear as to the accuracy of the numbers in their reports when returning from campaign. The law may have been aimed at Caesar, who would take up in the following year a governorship in Spain, where he would have opportunities to campaign against the Spanish tribes. Cato may also have been involved in the passage of a law requiring candidates at elections to make their official declarations of candidacy in person before an official within the city; such a law precluded a general from holding a military command and standing for office, as entering the pomerium vitiated promagisterial imperium (military command authority). This law may have been aimed at Pompey, who was thought to desire another consulship on his return, or Caesar, to force him to choose between the consulship and military glory.

Near the end of 62 BC, a scandal occurred involving Publius Clodius Pulcher's sacrilegious intrusion into secret rites to Bona Dea. When Clodius was acquitted on charges of sacrilege, apparently due to jury tampering via bribery, Cato moved to correct a loophole in the law. While the lex Aurelia in 70 BC had distributed the jury pool between senators, equestrians, and the tribuni aerarii, the anti-graft provisions of then-existing laws applied only to senators, meaning that bribing the non-senatorial jurors was legal. Cato's push against bribery was opposed by some of his normal allies, such as Cicero, who believed that it undermined senatorial government in alienating the equestrians, and was eventually dropped.

Senatorial leadership 

Cato was fortunate to emerge into politics during a "changing of the guard" in the senate. The previous Social War, followed by Sulla's civil war and then the proscriptions, had destroyed a great number of senatorial families. Because of the great bloodletting of previous decades and a growing trend toward semi-retirement rather than active political life after leaving office, by 65 BC, the number of active senior leaders – consulares, that is, former consuls – in the senate had fallen to just nine. Cato's pro-senatorial beliefs and oratorical skills positioned him in taking an active role in opposing those "men who[,] in his view[,] threatened the conventional order of the senate":

Moreover, his archaic mannerisms also helped him gain influence among the senators and the people: by making "himself into a living example of the old-fashioned Roman... [he] tapped into the deep vein of patriotism and conservatism that ran through the blood of every Roman citizen... disagreeing with [Cato] seemed to be a rejection of Roman tradition and therefore of Rome itself". His antiquarianism and birth to a family that had produced consuls more than a century into the past also helped win prestige among the senatorial elite, "who believed that their right to govern Rome was in large part inherited".

For Fred Drogula, a classicist and historian, Cato's posturing as "the voice of the ancestors enabled him to push or shame others into agreeing with his opinions", which also helped to make up for his meagre financial resources in an expensive political environment where large bribes paid to voters was a normal part of campaigning. His policies also symbolised "for the aristocracy a nobility of purpose and principle that they liked to associate with their whole order". It, however, made him a difficult ally or potential ally whose "extreme interpretation of conservatism gave him little room to compromise without seeming to abandon his principles".

By the end of his tribunate, he was very popular among the nobility: "such influence was remarkable for a man who had not yet reached the praetorship or commanded an army". He also was instrumental in uniting the senate, even at this earlier stage in his career, against Caesar; his success in his anti-Caesarian politics, however, forced Caesar "look elsewhere to achieve political success" and thereby forced Caesar to adopt more aggressive popularis tactics. In the years after his tribunate, many of the other leading conservative senators died or retired. Cato then assumed a loose leadership of the more conservative wing of senators, further bolstering his influence.

Before the civil war 

After his tribunate, Caesar left for Spain and Pompey returned to Rome in February 61 BC. Pompey divorced his wife, Mucia, the half-sister of Metellus Nepos, partly due to her adultery and partly to distance himself from the riots for which Metellus Nepos was blamed, and asked to marry one of Cato's nieces. The alliance proposal reflected Cato's recognition as a major political player; Cato rejected the offer, however, as "he did not want to lose or limit his freedom to act as he thought best in politics", indicating that he likely had already made up his mind to oppose Pompey's settlements and proposals.

In doing so, he drew a wedge between Pompey and the senate. His anti-Pompeian policy was likely a political error: Pompey was then seeking to reconcile with the senate; Cato's refusal forced Pompey to look for alternative allies to provide promised retirement lands to his veterans and secure ratification of his eastern settlements. He first sought to have one of his legates elected as consul for 60 BC: to do this, he distributed enormous bribes among the voters. In response, Cato again championed legislation banning bribery (proposed by a tribune named Marcus Aufidius Lurco), which was defeated, in part because the voters liked receiving payments for their votes. At the elections, Pompey's legate was successful, as well as Quintus Caecilius Metellus Celer, who had become one of Pompey's enemies after Pompey's divorce of Celer's half-sister, Mucia. Celer, along with Cato and Lucullus, then proceeded successfully to obstruct Pompey's agenda through the year. In this year, he also opposed a plan to renegotiate publicani tax collection contracts in Asia brought by Marcus Licinius Crassus with filibuster tactics, unheedful of alienating the wealthy publicani. Cato's success in opposing Pompey and Crassus' agendas forced them to recalculate; for both men, these were vital promises they had made to key supporters.

The return of Caesar from Spain in June of 60 BC forced Caesar too to choose: he either could enter the city and give up his command to stand for the consulship or he would retain the command in hopes for a triumph, per the law passed during Cato's tribunate. Caesar requested dispensation from the law from the senate – such dispensations were "regularly granted in order to foster stability and cohesion within [the senatorial class]" – but Cato proceeded to filibuster the request. In response, Caesar surprisingly gave up his triumph to stand for the consulship. Cato and his allies had tried to disincentivise Caesar's campaign by assigning the next year's consuls to an unimportant job in Italy. They also sought to get an opponent – Cato's son-in-law Marcus Calpurnius Bibulus – elected as Caesar's consular colleague, including by ignoring their own anti-bribery positions when matching the enormous bribes paid out by Caesar and his allies. In the end, both Caesar and Bibulus were elected as consuls for 59 BC.

Cato's successful opposition to Pompey and Crassus seemed to forebode poorly for Caesar's chance on his entrance to the consulship. "Denied the option of proceeding as a regular traditional consul if he wanted to get anything done... [Caesar] therefore entered into an unusual three-way alliance... with Pompey and Crassus", today known as the First Triumvirate. Caesar would play the junior partner and, as a middleman, ensure that Pompey and Crassus (who were themselves rivals) could cooperate.

Caesar's consulship (59 BC) 

Caesar's consular year started with his bringing a bill before the senate to distribute public lands to poor citizens and Pompey's veterans. Well written, brought in the traditional manner, and deferential to the senate's prerogatives, Cato lacked any real justification to oppose it; he settled instead for filibustering. For the whole of January, he prevented the senate from acting on the bill and was dragged to prison at Caesar's orders before being released. Caesar moved instead to bring the matter before the people.

Bibulus, called to a public debate on the bill, offered no substantive reasons for opposition before exclaiming, in frustration, "You will not have this law this year, not even should you all want it!" Thereafter, Cato and Bibulus entered the forum every morning to declare unfavourable religious omens and preclude a vote, until one morning they were assaulted in the street and driven off, pelted with manure. The bill then passed. Added to Caesar's bill was the requirement that senators swear to uphold the law or face punishment; Cato and an ally refused, until Cicero gave a face-saving argument that "Rome was better served by Cato's presence than by his absence", leading them to take the oath on the last day before the deadline.

With a sufficient portion of the public on Caesar's side after Bibulus' embarrassing display of obstinate obstructionism and Bibulus' self-confinement to his home, Caesar moved rapidly to pass further legislation. Over the first half of the year, he passed laws:
 recognising Ptolemy XII Auletes as Egyptian king,
 ratifying Pompey's eastern settlements,
 bailing out the publicani tax farmers for Crassus, and
 adding Campania to his lex agraria.

Cato and his allies continued to resist these bills, but were unsuccessful. Plutarch reports Cato was again dragged to prison for his opposition, but "it is likely that Plutarch has duplicated the story... for heroic effect". He also opposed the lex Vatinia which assigned to Caesar the provinces of Cisalpine Gaul and Illyricum for five years. Alone, he also opposed Caesar's assignment to Transalpine Gaul as well. Cato and his allies may also have engaged in a boycott of public business to cast doubt on the legitimacy of Caesar's acts.

Cato, however, supported one bill Caesar brought forth, the lex Iulia de repetundis, which detailed specific financial and administrative duties for governors to prevent extortion and embezzlement by provincial governors. His opposition to Caesar's legislative programme was likely focused only on those bills which would benefit Caesar personally, which – unlike passing land reform laws – suppressing corruption would not do.

Throughout the consulship, Cato and his allies also produced a substantive amount of propaganda meant to discredit Caesar and his triumviral allies by branding them tyrants, a message reinforced by the violence visited upon Bibulus to secure passage of the agrarian law; the campaign was successful in making it difficult for the three allies to use mob tactics out of fear that they might validate the opposition's rumours. The senators cowed into assent to Caesar's policies started to filter out of Caesar's camp, though "not necessarily joining Cato's group", leading to another reshuffling of alliances.

Cyprus (58 BC) 

Following Caesar's consulship and departure to Gaul, opponents of Caesar started to move to question the legal validity of his legislative actions. They also brought Publius Vatinius, the tribune who had passed the lex Vatinia assigning the provinces to Caesar, to stand charges, but the court proceedings were disrupted by a mob led by Publius Clodius Pulcher.

Pulcher had been elected during Caesar's consulship as one of the plebeian tribunes of 58 BC. Also in office were a number of triumvirate-friendly magistrates, including both consuls. In March of that year, Clodius promulgated a bill annexing the island of Cyprus. The assignment of governor was initially slated for one of the consuls – Aulus Gabinius, a friend of Pompey, – but after he was unable to take the post, Clodius promulgated a bill to appoint Cato instead as pro quaestore pro praetore. Reasons for the appointment are divided: the traditional view is that Clodius wanted Cato away on business; other historians have suggested that doing so was instead an attempt to forge a political alliance or that Cato allowed Clodius to send Cicero into exile for the appointment. Accounts of public reactions to the appointment also were divided: Cicero, for example, praised Cato for accepting it, as, even though Cicero rejected the annexation, he believed Cato to be the right person for the job; on the other hand, Plutarch reports that Cato was forced by law to go. Modern historians also see another reason: there was little productive to do in Rome when triumviral allies controlled all the major magistracies; leaving for Cyprus would allow Cato to buttress his reputation as an honest governor while waiting for the political winds to shift.

After arriving in Cyprus and announcing annexation, the local king – a Roman ally – there killed himself rather than suffer the indignity of deposition. Cato then "undertook every aspect of the cataloguing and appraisals [of the royal possessions] himself... and spoke with each prospective buyer to encourage them to bid on items". In doing so, he demonstrated great diligence, but alienated some of his friends in the meantime, receiving them poorly and treating them with suspicion. Cato's loss of his account books, low amount recovered from Cyprus, and over-preparation on his return to Rome could indicate that he engaged in some modest embezzlements or allowed his nephew, Marcus Junius Brutus, to engage in usurious moneylending or embezzlement on his behalf. His administration of Cyprus, was, however, well regarded on his reputation for honesty alone. Upon his return, he held, a de facto glittering naval parade up the Tiber before starting a procession conveying the treasures to the treasury.

Return from Cyprus 

By the time Cato returned from Cyprus, Clodius and Pompey had turned on each other and Cicero had been recalled from exile with Pompey's support. Cicero's gratitude and debt to Pompey had him support Pompey's ambitions: shortly after his return, Cicero proposed a prestigious and wide-ranging grain commission and proposed extraordinarily long supplicationes for Caesar's Gallic victories. Cato also divorced his loving wife Marcia so he could – with her father's consent – marry her to his friend, Quintus Hortensius, in part to cement an alliance.

By 56 BC, the triumviral coalition was "in a shambles". With Pompey attacked both by the conservative Cato-aligned senators and by Clodius – who was himself an independent operator – Pompey was forced to double down in his alliance with the other triumvirs. Added was the threat of Caesar's replacement in Gaul, setting up the renewal of the triumviral coalition at the Luca Conference: Caesar would, for Pompey, bring Clodius to heel; both Pompey and Crassus would receive prestigious military commands following a dual consulship; and Caesar would be renewed in Gaul. Without the ability to win elections outright, the three allies decided on chaos: "by desperate postponement of the elections into the following year... an interregnum would weaken the leadership of the opposition... [allowing] Crassus and Pompey to hope for more favourable results".

The consuls of 56 BC resigned without replacement at the close of their terms; the republic started 55 BC without magistrates. At untimely elections in late January marred by mob violence, Cato supported Lucius Domitius Ahenobarbus, his brother-in-law. After the triumvirs distributed bribes and used violence to force the other candidates from the elections, Pompey and Crassus were elected consuls for 55 BC and took office immediately. At those elections, Cato stood for the praetorship against Publius Vatinius; he secured support among the initial voters, so Pompey interrupted the elections to give more bribes and remove known Catonian voters. Vatinius was then elected.

At the debate that year about the lex Trebonia to grant Crassus the province of Syria so he could fight a war of choice against the Parthian Empire, Cato again repeated his tactic of filibustering until his opponents had him arrested so he could claim to be poorly treated. To avoid the a repeat of this embarrassment, at later debates, his attendance was barred by armed mobs. He tried similar obstructive tactics against the lex Licinia Pompeia to extend Caesar's command, but again failed. At this time, Plutarch reports – if not an injection of imaginative foreshadowing – that Cato moved to split Pompey from Caesar rather than opposing the united triumvirate. At the end of the year, Pompey was to assume his command in Spain but decided against tradition to stay near Rome and govern entirely through his legates.

Praetorship (54 BC) 

Pompey and Crassus' consulship, while a short-term success, was unsuccessful in the long-run. The elections for the magistrates for 54 BC were a victory for Cato and his allies. Without violence to force a decision in their favour, the electorate reacted coldly to the triumvirs' favoured candidates. Lucius Domitius Ahenobarbus – who had stood the previous year – and Appius Claudius Pulcher were elected. Cato was returned for a praetorship and allotted the presidency of the extortion court. Opponents of the triumvirs immediately brought a number of prosecutions against the triumvirs' allies, but almost all were acquitted "in large part because the complex network of connections among senators meant that the litigants could not be reduced to stark choices between two political parties or ideologies".

One case was that against Aulus Gabinius, who was convicted for receiving a ten thousand talent bribe from Ptolemy XII Auletes to invade Egypt and place  him back on the throne. Gabinius was forced into exile. Of the many prosecutions brought against triumviral supporters, Gabinius' was the only one successful. Cato may also have "ben[t] the laws" to expand the jurisdiction of his corruption court with the goal of furthering "anti-bribery reforms that he had thus far failed to advance".

Cato also brought legislation to clamp down on electoral bribery by requiring that all candidates submit detailed financial records. But the bill, although passed by the senate, was unpopular among the people and defeated: "the citizens on the whole profited from the large annual disbursements of cash by wealthy senators, and they no doubt wanted those payments to continue". Similarly unpopular was Cato's reaction to Caesar's victories over the Gauls and Germans: on receipt of reports that Caesar had attacked during a truce but won a victory in which he killed some 430 thousand Germans, "Cato alone expressed anger at the victory[;] he considered Caesar's actions to be a gross violation of 'international law'... [and] urged that Caesar be handed over to the survivors of the massacre in atonement".

That year also proved that Cato's push for stronger anti-bribery legislation both been a failure and was deeply needed. As interest rates doubled as candidates borrowed to finance bribes, a deal was struck between the two conservative sitting consuls, a triumviral supporter, and a triumviral opponent to pool resources to bribe voters and support the sitting consuls' assignment to desirable provinces. When one of the participants disclosed the plot to the senate, all were charged with electoral corruption, with the largest loss falling on the consul Domitius (Cato's brother-in-law). In response to the scandal, the senate delayed elections for an inquiry, but tribunes started to bring vetoes against various electoral proposals.

Chaos 

Repeated tribunician vetoes prevented elections to be held in 54 for the magistrates for 53 BC. The ancient sources believe that the delays were artificially created to justify the creation of Pompey as dictator, calls which Cato and senators such as Marcus Junius Brutus, strongly opposed. After Cato praised Pompey on his civic-mindedness in publicly refusing a possible dictatorship, he "seems to have created a momentary period of stability" which led to the election of two conservative consuls, Gnaeus Domitius Calvinus and Marcus Valerius Messalla Rufus in July 53 BC. During their truncated terms, they seem only to have tried to pass one bill, to introduce a delay between magistracy and governorship of five years: doing so reduced the ability for consuls to select their own provinces and made it more difficult to borrow money, to be repaid from provincial earnings, by delaying those provincial earnings. Cato was probably one of the co-authors and major supporters of the proposal; it was, however, defeated before the people and panned by younger senators.

While Caesar's daughter, Julia, had died the previous year, Pompey's support of Caesar continued: he lent a legion from Spain to Gaul at Caesar's request (a deal Cato condemned for bypassing the senate and treating public legions as personal property). Also in 53, news arrived of Crassus' defeat and death at the hands of the Parthians in Syria. While Plutarch reports this made a confrontation between Caesar and Pompey inevitable, their alliance did not immediately break down, even after Pompey's marriage to Cornelia Metella.

The year also was rocked with political violence between the duelling mobs led by Clodius and Titus Annius Milo, who also was standing for the consulship. Their months-long clashes, along with tribunician obstruction against the holding of elections, led again to calls for Pompey as dictator. After the year 52 started with no magistrates and Clodius was murdered by Milo after a chance encounter outside of Rome, the level of violence increased; among other things, the senate house and the Basilica Porcia in the Forum was destroyed by fire in Clodius' makeshift funeral pyre.

Pompey's sole consulship (52 BC) 

With a political impasse and anarchy in the streets, Cato and Bibulus proposed making Pompey sole consul (i.e. consul without a colleague). Plutarch and others report that this was to deny Pompey a dictatorship while also establishing a functioning government. Some modern historians, such as John T Ramsey, however, conceive of the choice in political terms: the obstructive tribunes wanted to prosecute Milo for Clodius' murder, which could not happen if he were elected to the consulship and gained legal immunity. Electing Pompey alone would stabilise the city and, by precluding Milo's election, ensure Milo could be brought to trial. While a clear departure from tradition, it allowed Pompey to be brought on side while also restoring order to the city without handing Pompey unlimited power.

Pompey's sole consulship was a turning point in the republic. He convened a trial, with the jury intimidated by his soldiers, in which Milo was charged with public disorder. Cato was one of the jurors and two of his allies helped conduct the trial, which may indicate a compromise to bring Milo to trial; Cato made clear his vote for acquittal, but – even with Cicero defending – Milo was condemned regardless. However, Cato had not succeeded in bringing Pompey fully into the senatorial fold: Pompey during his consulship supported the so-called "law of the ten tribunes" which granted Caesar the right to stand for the consulship in absentia.

With starting success in forcing a break between Pompey and Caesar, Cato stood for the consulship of 51 BC. He reportedly did so out of a claim of public duty, in the vein of Lucius Quinctius Cincinnatus being summoned by the people, to defend the republic from Caesar and Pompey. He was defeated after running an austere campaign in which he "distribute[d] no cash and promise[d] no favours; the campaign seem[ed] to have been designed to win admiration rather than votes". Cicero complained that while the state needed him, Cato was unwilling or unable to put aside his "vision of the mos maiorum to do what was necessary to win an election"; after his defeat, Cato did not stand for the consulship again.

Caesar's civil war

The First Triumvirate had been formed to get around Cato's obstructionism. From around 52 BC onwards, "Cato and the men around [Pompey] certainly fostered Pompey's famous paranoia" and tried to separate him from Caesar. For some time, Pompey tried to keep his options open, but was eventually won over that his pre-eminence was incompatible with Caesar's rising influence and popularity. Cato continued to arrange opposition to Caesar and continued to spread the view that Caesar was a tyrant-in-making, which by 51 BC became a common view among the senatorial elite. However, by this point, events began to spiral out of Cato's control, as the initiative moved towards Cato's allies who, unlike Cato, were willing to go to any length to destroy Caesar.

Attempts to recall Caesar from Gaul started in earnest in 51 BC under consul Marcus Claudius Marcellus (Cato's former quaestorian colleague). After Caesar's victory at the Battle of Alesia, he argued the rationale for Caesar's standing for the consulship in absentia was gone and that Caesar's provincia (here meaning "task") was complete and, therefore, he and his army should return home. Such attempts were vetoed by Caesar's allies in the tribunate and also opposed by Pompey. The next year, 50 BC, the senate was starting to move in earnest to discuss termination of Caesar's command; in response, Caesar tried to secure new allies with bribes, including one of the consuls elected for the year, Lucius Aemilius Paullus.

Among Caesar's allies was Gaius Scribonius Curio, who cleverly proposed that both Caesar and Pompey should disarm by giving up their commands concurrently; Cato, according to Plutarch, apparently exclaimed that the proposal was a Caesarian plot to take over the government, which "may be a fabrication by later authors". Such strong opposition "seems premature at best" and would have been inconsistent with Cato's general inclination to reduce the power of all great men. Regardless, the majority of senators viewed the proposal favourably, as mutual disarmament would bring down tensions and avert a possible civil war. Opposition to Curio's proposal highlighted that Pompey's term in Spain was still relatively recent, having been granted in 52 BC, making it unjustifiable to strip Pompey of his command so soon. However, the vast majority of the senate (370 to 22) accepted Curio's compromise. Cato's vote on this important matter is unrecorded, though most historians believe Cato voted against it, probably to pressure Caesar to fold. Some historians, however, such as Helga Botermann, believe that letters from Seneca may suggest that Cato voted in favour.

Cato's years of advocacy against Caesar had inculcated a confrontational anti-Caesarian policy among younger senators, hoping that a united senatorial front would force Caesar to fold. The success of his strategy of branding Caesar a tyrant would "[help] drive many senators to war". By the weeks before the start of the war in early January 49 BC, Cato, Pompey, and their allies had hardened their political position to the point where they were unwilling to offer any concessions at all. Cato continued to push Pompey and others to maintain a hard-line, rejecting all proposed compromises, in the hope that Caesar would back down. On the 7th of January, 49 BC, the senate was sufficiently frightened and browbeaten to pass a senatus consultum ultimum against Caesar, likely under the false pretences that Caesar was already invading.

Flight from Italy 

Caesar did not back down and instead crossed the Rubicon, to Cato's surprise. While "Cato and his supporters had worked tenaciously to push Caesar into a corner where his only choices were civil war and political ruin... Cato seems to have been surprised and depressed by the consequences of his political strategy... he would soon be found saying that peace was worth making concessions". When news of Caesar's rapid advance south reached Rome, Pompey made the decision to flee Italy for the eastern provinces and to use the fleet to contain Caesar to Italy before retaking the peninsula.

When Caesar offered peace terms on 23 January that he would be willing to lay down his command and stand for a consulship in person in return for amnesty and Pompey's departure to Spain, Cicero relates that Cato strongly supported the plan and forced himself into the war council at which the proposal was discussed. That the peace offers were decisively rejected by the hard-liners who wanted to defeat Caesar militarily indicates that Cato by this point had lost control of his coalition. He attempted to have the senate give Pompey overall command, but the senate chose to divide command among various generals, whom Caesar then defeated in detail.

Pompey assigned Cato to Sicily to raise men and supplies. This decision "may have been more political than military": Pompey may have wanted to keep Cato and his gloomy attitude on the civil war away from the actual fighting. Another reconstruction, however, places Cato at the centre of an abortive strategy to blockade Italy to starve Caesar out by stripping Italy of Sicilian grain supplies. But on 23 April, after being faced with a landing by Gaius Asinius Pollio, he abandoned the island – apparently, according to Cicero, without giving battle, even though his forces were sufficient to resist. Regardless, after further Caesarian landings under Curio, Cato would have been forced to retreat.

Greece and Africa 

After retreating, Cato fled to join Pompey at Dyrrhachium. Upon his arrival there, Plutarch relates that Cato admitted that Cicero's more moderate policy, advocating compromise with Caesar, had been "more useful to his country": "[Cato's] distress at the consequences of his own hard-line policies... may have been weigh heavily on him". He was then sent to Asia Minor to organise transport ships; but finding no need for himself, he induced Rhodes to take Pompey's side and left his family there before returning to Pompey in Greece, where he declined command of naval forces, citing Bibulus' senior consular status. After the indecisive Pompeian victory at the Battle of Dyrrhachium, Cato is said to have "wailed loudly for his country... [and] lamented the destructive and miserable lust for power" after seeing the casualties.

Cato was not present at the Battle of Pharsalus. He had opposed the proposals that Pompey should chase Caesar down after his withdrawal from Dyrrhachium. Left behind in command at Dyrrhachium, also possibly for political reasons to remove critics (including Cicero) from decision-making following a prospective Pompeian victory, Cato received news of the defeat from Titus Labienus. In the aftermath of the defeat, he decamped to Corcyra and asked Cicero to take command because he still held imperium from his promagistracy and was the senior consular present; Cicero declined, preferring instead to return home and seek Caesar's pardon. Allowing defectors to leave peacefully, Cato loaded his men and set sail for Egypt via Cyrene. But learning of Pompey's death at the hands of the Ptolemies and that Quintus Caecilius Metellus Pius Scipio was still in command in Africa, he moved to join them. Discovering a fractured situation, he reconciled Metellus Scipio with Publius Attius Varus and had Metellus Scipio put in command. While the recorded reasons were that Cato believed that Metellus Scipio had both consular dignity and a name that would inspire the soldiers, as the inheritor of the Cornelii Scipiones that had defeated Hannibal, "[Cato] probably had no stomach for fighting against his countrymen".

Final campaign and death 

Cato was given command of the city of Utica after convincing Metellus Scipio to spare the town's inhabitants when they attempted to defect to Caesar. He successfully expanded the city's defences, raised troops, and stockpiled supplies while waiting for Caesar's eventual arrival. During his time in Africa, however, Cato became convinced that Metellus Scipio "would not behave with moderation if victorious over Caesar".

Attempting to prevail over Metellus Scipio with a policy of attrition by forcing Caesar to stretch his supply lines, Metellus Scipio accused Cato of cowardice for being unwilling to risk battle. Around this time, Cato privately confided that the war was hopeless and that he would abandon Rome regardless of the victor: "Cato's experience in the war and in Africa seems to have convinced him that the republic as he conceived of it was gone". Metellus Scipio ignored Cato's relatively pacific advice and engaged in a decisive battle at Thapsus, where his forces were annihilated.

Cato, garrisoning Utica, received news of the defeat three days later, which drove the city into a panic. Knowing that the city would likely defect, Cato evacuated any Roman citizens who wished to flee. He also sent an embassy consisting of his family and allies, headed by one of Caesar's kinsmen, Lucius Julius Caesar, to seek pardon for themselves. Cato himself prepared for death.

After righting the city's financial accounts and disbursing the remaining monies to the city's inhabitants, Cato discussed with his friends at dinner the Stoic belief that a truly free man would never become a slave. After he demanded his sword, which had been removed from his room, his family and friends begged him not to kill himself. Dismissing them, he asked for a report on the ships fleeing the city. Satisfied that all was well, he stabbed himself in the abdomen. The specific details of Cato's suicide were greatly embellished after his death, especially in Plutarch's account, which states:

After his death, upon its discovery by Caesar, Caesar "declared that he was angry to have missed the opportunity of pardoning him".

Legacy and reception

Cato's death triggered a series of eulogies, of which both Cicero and Brutus were authors, starting to identify Cato as a "great Stoic philosopher". Caesar responded with an Anticato, which has not survived, although it "may have taken the form of a... speech in which Caesar accused Cato of some crime".

Political legacy 

Cato's "politics of constant obstruction and provocation" also made compromise "significantly harder to achieve" while also being "at variance with everything that was most traditional about the republic... it was a dangerous political stance that prevented both him and others from addressing the actual problems Rome faced and from finding solutions that could have created a more stable and less contested republic". The traditional political culture of the middle republic was one built around aristocratic compromise, political debate, and reform. Yet, Cato's obstructive tactics "were unconventional and even radical [in] trying to block senatorial consensus rather than promote it". His policies with regard to stopping powerful politicians such as Pompey, Caesar, and Crassus alienated – through its very success – them from the rest of the senatorial class, leading to the formation of their alliance in 59 BC.

Many scholars believe that Cato's political strategy before 49 BC contributed significantly in starting the civil war that was the proximate cause of the collapse of the Roman republic, even if he did not intend for conflict. While his strategy – convincing senators that Caesar was a threat to the republic and wanted to make himself king – was "a great success", that success in convincing other members of the senate backfired: "the men who assumed the leading roles in opposing Caesar.... were willing to go to any length to destroy [him], even if that meant a civil war".

During most of his political career, he "steadfastly pursued" the "frustration of powerful military figures... by the unparalleled exploitation of all the obstructive tactics available". This uncompromising position had him push strongly, before the civil war, for further confrontation with Caesar, seemingly to pressure Caesar to back down. Cato and his allies also pushed Pompey away from the various olive branches and compromises before the civil war. Up to the last, when Pompey was close to accepting an offer where Caesar would give up all his legions except one and provinces except Illyricum, Cato chastised Pompey for "allowing himself to be deceived 'again'". To the extent that Caesar may have feared prosecution, conviction, and exile – a "dubious" claim – Cato was one of the few pushing strongly for Caesar's political destruction via prosecution.

After his death, his "rivalry [with Caesar] came to be seen as a conflict of ideologies... Cato increasingly came to be seen as a hero of the republic... [with his] life and death [becoming] symbols of the dying republic". His life was also appropriated by Augustus as a symbol of republican values.

As a stoic 

Modern scholars note that "the 'Stoic martyr' tradition has distorted or distracted from the historical Cato". The extent of his belief in Stoicism is debated.

Some scholars point to how Cato acted in ways profoundly inconsistent with Stoic tenets: his anger at the breaking of his betrothal to Aemilia Lepida, breakdown over the death of his half-brother Caepio, his visible despair at the sight of casualties from the civil wars, etc. For such scholars, Cato's actions fit into the mould of a traditional Roman acting in line with traditional Roman values rather than Stoic ones.

On the other hand, others point out that Cato's contemporaries noted his Stoic behaviours and positions explicitly. Cicero lampooned it in Pro Murena, and also mentioned it in letters and contemporaneous philosophical texts.

Legacy through time

Chronology
 95 BC: Birth in Rome
 67 BC: Military tribune in Macedon
 65 BC: Quaestor in Rome (some scholars date this to 64 BC)
 63 BC: Catiline conspiracy; Cato speaks for the death penalty
 62 BC: Tribune of the Plebs; Cato passes grain dole
 60 BC: Forces Caesar to choose between consulship and triumph
 59 BC: Opposes Caesar's laws
 58 BC: Governorship of Cyprus (leaves at the end of 58/returns March 56)
 55 BC: unsuccessful 1st run for praetorship
 54 BC: Praetor
 51 BC: Runs (unsuccessfully) for consul
 49 BC: Caesar crosses the Rubicon and invades Italy; Cato goes with Pompey to Greece
 48 BC: Battle of Pharsalus, Pompey defeated; Cato goes to Africa
 46 BC: Scipio defeated in the Battle of Thapsus; Cato kills himself in Utica (April)

Family

Cato himself 
 Engaged to Aemilia Lepida, but engagement called off
 First wife, Atilia (divorced)
 Porcia, married first to Marcus Calpurnius Bibulus, then to Marcus Junius Brutus
 Marcus Porcius Cato, later killed in the Second Battle of Philippi
 Second (and third) wife Marcia.

Descent from Cato the Elder 

 Marcus Porcius Cato (cos. 195 BC)
 Marcus Porcius Cato Licinianus (pr. 152 BC)
 Marcus Porcius Cato (cos. 118 BC)
 Marcus Porcius Cato (pr. )
 Gaius Porcius Cato (cos. 114 BC)
 Marcus Porcius Cato Salonianus (pr. ? BC)
 Marcus Porcius Cato (pl. tr. 99 BC)
 Porcia (wife of Domitius Ahenobarbus)
 Marcus Porcius Cato "Uticensis" (pr. 54 BC)
 Porcia (wife of Brutus)
 Marcus Porcius Cato (died 42 BC)
 Lucius Porcius Cato (cos. 89 BC)

As part of Brutus' family

See also
 Porcia gens

Notes

References

Citations

Sources

Further reading

External links 

 

 
1st-century BC Romans
95 BC births
46 BC deaths
Ancient Roman politicians who committed suicide
Correspondents of Cicero
Cato Uticensis, Marcus
Senators of the Roman Republic
Suicides by sharp instrument
Suicides in Tunisia
Optimates
Family of Servilia (mother of Brutus)